

Colors in alphabetical order A–F

 

|}

See also

Basic Color Terms: Their Universality and Evolution (book)
Color blindness
Colors of the rainbow
Eye color
Index of color-related articles
List of colors: G–M
List of colors: N–Z
List of color palettes
List of colors (compact)
List of Crayola crayon colors
Pantone colors
Pigment
Primary color
Secondary color
Tertiary color
Tincture (heraldry)
X11 color names

References
Citations

Sources

C01